Charles MacCarty, Viscount Muskerry (1633 or 1634 – 1665), called Cormac in Irish, commanded a royalist battalion at the Battle of the Dunes during the interregnum. He was heir apparent to Donough MacCarty, 1st Earl of Clancarty but was killed at the age of 31 at the Battle of Lowestoft, a sea-fight against the Dutch, during the Second Anglo-Dutch War, and thus never succeeded to the earldom. He was buried in Westminster Abbey.

Birth and origins 
Charles (i.e. Cormac) was born in 1633 or 1634, probably at Macroom Castle, County Cork, Ireland, his parents' habitual residence. He was the eldest son of Donough MacCarty and his wife Eleanor (or Ellen) Butler. He is also known as Cormac and this seems to have been his original name, whereas Charles seems to be a later English or French adaptation. At the time of his birth, Charles's father was the 2nd Viscount Muskerry, but he would be advanced to Earl of Clancarty in 1658. His father's family were the MacCartys of Muskerry, a Gaelic Irish dynasty that branched from the MacCarthy-Mor line with Dermot MacCarthy, second son of Cormac MacCarthy-Mor, a medieval Prince of Desmond. This second son had been granted the Muskerry area as appanage.

Charles's mother (1612–1682) was the eldest sister of James Butler, the future Duke of Ormond. Her family, the Butler dynasty, was Old English and descended from Theobald Walter, who had been appointed Chief Butler of Ireland by King Henry II in 1177. Charles's parents were both Catholic. He had two brothers and two sisters, who are listed in his father's article.

Irish wars 
At the time of his birth, Ireland enjoyed a period of peace between the end of Tyrone's Rebellion (1593–1603) and the Irish Rebellion of 1641. His father, after some hesitation, joined the Confederates in March 1642 and fought in that year at the Siege of Limerick and the Battle of Liscarroll.

In 1645 Pope Innocent X sent Giovanni Battista Rinuccini as nuncio to Ireland. Rinuccini landed at Kenmare, County Kerry. and passed by Macroom Castle on his way to Kilkenny. Cormac, about 11 years old, met Rinuccini, who was welcomed by his mother at the castle. His father opposed Rinuccini and was detained when Rinuccini overturned the Confederate government in a coup d'état.

in May 1647, when Charles was but 13 years old, his father sent him to France with a regiment to take service in Louis XIV's army. Charles sailed from Waterford on 15 May 1647. He was accompanied by John Callaghan, a Catholic priest and Jansenist, who was his tutor.

In April 1650 his family lost Macroom Castle, where Charles had spent his childhood, in the context of the Battle of Macroom. Around that time, anticipating the loss of Macroom or because of it, his father sent Cormac's mother, sisters and youngest brother to security in France. His mother then lived in Paris, where she rented an apartment in the convent of the Feuillantines.

After Rinuccini's departure, his father took up arms again to fight the Cromwellians but was defeated in 1651 by Broghill at Knocknaclashy and surrendered his last stronghold, Ross Castle, to Edmund Ludlow in 1652.

On the continent 
In France, MacCarty (Charles or Cormac) and his Irish regiment were employed to fight the Spanish in the Franco-Spanish War (1635–1659) on the border between France and the Spanish Netherlands.

Condé-sur-l'Escaut 
MacCarty's regiment was part of the garrison of Condé-sur-l'Escaut when the town was taken by the Spanish shortly after their victory over the French at the Battle of Valenciennes on 16 July 1656.

King Charles II, in exile in the Spanish Netherlands since March 1656, sent the Marquess of Ormond, MacCarty's uncle, to ask him to join him with his regiment. He refused to change sides without having laid down his commission in proper form. Having done this, however, he obeyed his king and changed sides together with his regiment, thereafter serving Charles II in Spanish pay. This regiment was then called the Duke of York's regiment after Charles II's brother the Duke of York and future James II.

Battle of the Dunes 
MacCarty fought with his regiment at the Battle of the Dunes on 14 June 1658 where it formed part of the English royalist army under the Duke of York that fought together with the Spanish on the losing side against the victorious French and Protectorate English.

On 27 November 1658 his father was created Earl of Clancarty by Charles II in Brussels. By this advancement, the title of Viscount of Muskerry became the highest subsidiary title of the family, which was then given as courtesy title to the Earl's heir apparent. In consequence, MacCarty was styled Viscount Muskerry thereafter.

Restoration 
At the Restoration Muskerry, as he now was, did not accompany the king to Dover in May 1660 but stayed with his regiment at Dunkirk until at least March 1662. He seems to have left shortly before the Sale of Dunkirk in November 1662. His father, the 1st Earl of Clancarty, had meanwhile returned to Ireland and recovered his estates by virtue of Charles II "Gracious Declaration" of the 30 November 1660. His father sat as Lord Clancarty in the Irish Parliament of 1661–1666 and was part oif a committee that organised a gift of  £30,000 for the Duke of Ormond. On 19 August 1662, Muskerry was called to the parliament to replace his father on that committee.

Marriage and children 
In 1660 or 1661 Muskerry married Margaret Bourke, a rich heiress, the only child of Ulick Burke, 1st Marquess of Clanricarde and Lady Anne Compton.

 
Charles and Margaret had a girl and a boy:
Frances (1662–1675), died young
Charles (1663–1666), succeeded his grandfather as the 2nd Earl, but died as an infant

Life at the Restoration court 
Lord and Lady Muskerry frequently attended the court at Whitehall. In July 1663 they went with the court to take the waters at Tunbridge Wells during which visit the Muskerrys as well as Elizabeth Hamilton and Elizabeth Wetenhall stayed at nearby Somerhill House, which had been built by Lady Muskerry's grandfather, Richard Burke, 4th Earl of Clanricarde and had been given back to her at the Restoration. This visit to Tunbridge is described by Antoine Hamilton in his semi-fictional Mémoires du comte de Gramont (written 1704–1710).

The Mémoires du comte de Gramont (Chapter 7) tell how Elizabeth Hamilton made fun of Lady Muskerry by making her believe that the King had invited her to a masquerade and that she had to disguise herself as a Babylonian woman. She was however not invited to this masquerade, which took place in February 1665.

Death, succession, and timeline 
The Second Anglo-Dutch War broke out on 4 March 1665. Muskerry was killed on 3 June 1665 in the Battle of Lowestoft, a naval engagement, on board of the flagship, the Royal Charles, by a cannonball, which also killed Charles Berkeley, 1st Earl of Falmouth. He was 31 years old. Muskerry was buried on 19 June with great pomp at Westminster Abbey.

Muskerry had an infant son, Charles James, who succeeded him as heir apparent and Viscount of Muskerry. However, the 1st Earl, his father, died on 4 August 1665 surviving him by only two months, and the little Charles James, therefore, succeeded as the 2nd Earl but died about a year later, on 22 September 1666, still an infant. Thereupon Callaghan, his uncle, succeeded as the 3rd Earl of Clancarty.

His widow made two further marriages: to Robert Villiers, and to Robert Fielding. She died in 1698 at Somerhill House. Her widower made a scandalous and bigamous marriage to Barbara Palmer, 1st Duchess of Cleveland, former royal mistress of Charles II.

Notes and references

Notes

Citations

Sources 
Subject matter monographs:
Click here. Webb 1878 in Compendium of Irish Biography
—

 
 
  – 1642 to 1660
 
  – (for MacCarty)
  – (for Ormond)
  – 1643 to 1660
  – Marriages, baptisms and burials from about 1660 to 1875
 
 
 
  – Canonteign to Cutts (for Clancarty)
  
  – Scotland and Ireland
  – 1665 to 1706
 
  – 1625 to 1655
 
 
  – (for timeline)
 
  – 1634 to 1699
  – 1661 to 1665
 
  – Blood royal, dukes, earls (for Clanricarde)
  – Viscounts (for Thurles)
 
 
  
 
  – Irish stem
 
  – (Preview)
  – 1 January 1664 to 29/30 June 1665
 
 
 
 
 

1665 deaths
British courtesy viscounts
Burials at Westminster Abbey
English military personnel killed in action
French Army officers
Heirs apparent who never acceded
Irish soldiers in the French Army
MacCarthy dynasty
Royal Navy personnel of the Anglo-Dutch Wars
Year of birth uncertain